Asterophryinae is a subfamily of microhylid frogs distributed in an area from the Peninsular Malaysia through the Malay Archipelago to northern Australia.

Genera
The following genera are recognised in the subfamily Asterophryinae:

The most species-rich genus is Oreophryne (71 species). Two genera are monotypic: Oninia and Siamophryne.

The genera Siamophryne and Vietnamophryne were added to Asterophryinae in 2018.

Body size

Microhylid frogs are generally small.

References

Microhylidae
Frogs of Asia
Amphibians of Australia
Amphibian subfamilies
Taxa named by Albert Günther